The following are the results of the 1976–77 MJHL season for the Canadian Manitoba Junior Hockey League ice hockey team.

Champion
On April 5, 1977, Manitoba Junior Hockey League (MJHL) commissioner Bill Addison suspended the Turnbull Cup Finals between the Dauphin Kings and Kildonan North Stars, awarding it to Dauphin on the basis they won two of the three games completed.

League notes
As of the 1976-77 season the West Kildonan name was shorted to the Kildonan North Stars.
Jim Misener of the Dauphin Kings became the MJHL career leader in goals, assists, and points, with 205 goals, 208 assists, and 413 points.
League suspends Turnbull Cup Finals, awards it to Dauphin.

Regular season

Playoffs
Division Semi-Finals
Dauphin defeated Thompson 4-games-to-none
Brandon defeated Selkirk 4-games-to-3
Kildonan defeated St. James 4-games-to-1
Kenora defeated St. Boniface 4-games-to-2
Divisional Finals
Dauphin defeated Brandon 4-games-to-none
Kildonan defeated Kenora 4-games-to-3
Turnbull Cup Championship
Dauphin defeated Kildonan 2-games-to-1
Anavet Cup Championship
Dauphin lost to Prince Albert Raiders (SJHL) 4-games-to-1

Awards

All-Star Team

References
Manitoba Junior Hockey League
Manitoba Hockey Hall of Fame
Hockey Hall of Fame
Winnipeg Free Press Archives
Brandon Sun Archives

MJHL
Manitoba Junior Hockey League seasons